Maisamma, also known as Mesai and additionally spelt Mesko (Marathi: मेस्को), Amma in Telugu or Aai in Marathi ("mother") is a Hindu folk goddess. She is mainly worshipped as a South Indian mother goddess, predominantly in the rural areas of Telangana, Karnataka and Maharashtra.
She is believed to protect the cattle. Among the cattle sheds, a niche is white-washed and decorated with "Kukuma" and called "Maisamma Goodu". In many places Katta-Maisamma is also workshiped as a goddess of water and is workshiped in the form of a small stone on the tank bund. People believe that she will ensure that the tank is full.

She is believed to be the daughter of Shiva and Parvati.
As per the place she is worshipped, she is called in different names :

1. Katta Maisamma (who protects water) 
2. Nalla maisamma (who is in black color and worshipped under a tree)
3. tella maisamma (who is white and worshipped in a small tomb like structure or wall)
4. bangaaru maisamma (who is in golden complexion and safe guards the town / village)
5. vendi maisamma (who is worshipped in outskirts of the village and wears silver)
6. Panta maisamma (who is worshipped in the agricultural lands, she doesnt has any idols, she is worshipped before and after the crop harvest)

Thus, the corps would flourish due to her blessings.
Her worship is mainly associated with curing diseases such as smallpox and chickenpox.

See also
 Katta Maisamma temple
 Maisigandi Maisamma Temple, Kadthal
 Gandhari Maisamma Jatra
 Mariamman

Notes

Regional Hindu gods
Hindu folk deities
Health goddesses
Hindu goddesses
Mother goddesses
Smallpox deities